Kyle Sampson is a fictional character from the CBS daytime soap opera Guiding Light. He was played by Larkin Malloy from 1984 to 1987. Kyle was the result of an affair between Cardinal John Malone and Sally Gleason. He was the President of Sampson Industries which caused him to become an enemy to both Alan Spaulding and Billy Lewis. It was once believed that Kyle was the son of Lewis Oil founder, H.B. Lewis. Kyle was in love with and engaged to Billy and H.B.'s ex-wife Reva Shayne. Kyle Sampson was once believed to be the biological father of Reva's daughter Marah. But he was the biological father of Ben Reade with his ex-wife Maeve. In 1987 after having left Springfield Kyle had become engaged to a woman named Amy Dupree. Later in that same year Kyle and Amy were involved in a plane crash that killed both Amy and his father John Malone and left Kyle comatose.

Sampson, Kyle
Fictional business executives